"Teenage Kicks" was a 1978 pop punk single by The Undertones.

Teenage Kicks may also refer to:
 Teenage Kicks (TV series), a 2008 British sitcom
 Teenage Kicks (band), a Canadian alternative rock band, active from 2010
 Teenage Kicks (film), a 2016 Australian drama film directed by Craig Boreham
 "One Way or Another (Teenage Kicks)", a 2013 One Direction song for Comic Relief